Teays Valley is a census-designated place (CDP) in Putnam County, West Virginia,  United States.  The place is divided into the two districts of Teays Valley and Scott Depot.  The population was 13,175 at the 2010 census. Teays Valley is part of the Huntington-Ashland, WV-KY-OH, Metropolitan Statistical Area (MSA). As of the 2010 census, the MSA had a population of 287,702. New definitions from February 28, 2013 placed the population at 363,000. This CDP place was named after trapper/hunter Thomas Teays, who spend a considerable amount of time staying here.

Geography
Teays Valley is located at  (38.447204, -81.937324).

According to the United States Census Bureau, the CDP has a total area of 7.3 square miles (18.8 km2), of which 7.2 square miles (18.6 km2) is land and 0.1 square mile (0.3 km2) (1.34%) is water.

The valley referred to by "Teays Valley" is a portion of the remains of the pre-glacial Teays River. Today, the valley's water is shed through a number of creeks which empty into the Kanawha and Mud rivers.

Demographics
As of the census of 2000, there were 12,704 people, 4,789 households, and 3,749 families residing in the CDP. The population density was 1,730.0 people per square mile (668.3/km2). There were 5,062 housing units at an average density of 689.3/sq mi (266.3/km2). The racial makeup of the CDP was 96.39% White, 0.94% Black or African American, 0.11% Native American, 1.59% Asian, 0.02% Pacific Islander, 0.25% from other races, and 0.70% from two or more races. Hispanics or Latinos of any race were 0.77% of the population.

There were 4,789 households, out of which 39.6% had children under the age of 18 living with them, 67.3% were married couples living together, 9.0% had a female householder with no husband present, and 21.7% were non-families. 19.1% of all households were made up of individuals, and 7.6% had someone living alone who was 65 years of age or older. The average household size was 2.62 and the average family size was 3.00.

The age distribution was 27.2% under 18, 6.4% from 18 to 24, 29.8% from 25 to 44, 24.1% from 45 to 64, and 12.4% who were 65 or older. The median age was 38 years. For every 100 females, there were 92.0 males. For every 100 females age 18 and over, there were 87.6 males.

The median income for a household in Teays Valley was $53,053, and the median income for a family was $62,711. Males had a median income of $52,083 versus $27,036 for females. The per capita income for the CDP was $24,236. About 6.5% of families and 8.1% of the population were below the poverty line, including 9.6% of those under age 18 and 8.0% of those age 65 or over.

Fire Department
The Teays Valley area is primarily protected by the Teays Valley Fire Department.  The department was founded in 1964 by the Scott/Teays Lions Club as an all volunteer department. In March 2013 the TVFD became a combination fire department consisting of 24/7 coverage by a paid staff supplemented by a group of dedicated volunteers.

Education
The Putnam County Schools operates public schools. The area's public school students are split between Hurricane High School in Hurricane, and Winfield High in Winfield.

A private K-12 school, Teays Valley Christian School, is also located in the community.

The West Virginia International School (ウエストバージニア国際学校 Uesuto Bājinia Kokusai Gakkō), a Japanese weekend school, holds its classes at Scott Teays Elementary School in Scott Depot. The school office is in Building 6 of the West Virginia Department of Education facility in Charleston.

Notable person
 Jack Whittaker, winner of the largest undivided lottery prize in history and the third-largest jackpot in U.S. history, lived in Teays Valley at the time of his win.

Gallery

References

Census-designated places in Putnam County, West Virginia
Census-designated places in West Virginia
Charleston, West Virginia metropolitan area